This is a list of urban areas in Denmark by population. For a list on cities in Denmark please see List of cities in Denmark by population.

The population is measured by Statistics Denmark for urban areas (Danish: byområder or bymæssige områder), which is defined as a contiguous built-up area with a maximum distance of 200 m between houses, unless further distance is caused by public areas, cemeteries or similar reasons. Furthermore, to obtain by-status, the area must have at least 200 inhabitants. Some urban areas in Denmark have witnessed conurbation and grown together.



See also
Largest metropolitan areas in the Nordic countries
List of metropolitan areas in Sweden
List of urban areas in Sweden by population
List of urban areas in Norway by population
List of urban areas in the Nordic countries
List of urban areas in Finland by population
List of cities in Iceland
World's largest cities

Notes

References

Denmark
Denmark
Denmark

Urban

ca:Llista de ciutats de Dinamarca
da:Danmarks største byer
eo:Listo de urboj de Danio
fr:Villes du Danemark
kk:Дания қалаларының тізімі
lv:Dānijas pilsētu uzskaitījums
nl:Lijst van grote Deense steden
no:Liste over danske byer
pl:Miasta Danii
ru:Города Дании
sv:Lista över städer i Danmark efter storlek